Kaniat Khalil is a town in Gujar Khan Tehsil, Rawalpindi, Punjab, Pakistan. Kaniat Khalil is also chief town of Union Council Kaniat Khalil which is an administrative subdivision of the Tehsil.

Government of Pakistan
Mirza Aurangzeb Khan is the current Lambardar passed down to him form his father Mirza Mohammed Kayani.
It operates a High School in Kaniat Khalil. In 2015 there were 223 students and 10 teachers, and 9 classrooms.

References

Union_councils_of_Rawalpindi_District

Villages in Pakistan